Facundo Hernán Farías (born 28 August 2002) is an Argentine professional footballer who plays as an attacking midfielder for Club Atlético Colón.

Club career
Farías started off with Escuela de Fútbol UNL, prior to having a stint in the academy of Corinthians Santa Fe. In 2015, Farías headed off to Colón's youth system. November 2019 saw the midfielder moved into the club's first-team squad, ahead of a Primera División home fixture with Atlético Tucumán. Farías' professional debut subsequently arrived, as he featured for the final nineteen minutes of a defeat at the Estadio Brigadier General Estanislao López on 2 November after replacing Mauro Da Luz. Farías scored three goals in eight Copa de la Liga Profesional matches; versus Defensa y Justicia, Central Córdoba and Atlético Tucumán.

International career
In 2015, Farías was called up to the Argentina U15s. Farías received call-ups to train with the Argentina U17s in 2019.

Career statistics
.

Notes

References

External links

2002 births
Living people
Footballers from Santa Fe, Argentina
Argentine footballers
Association football midfielders
Argentine Primera División players
Club Atlético Colón footballers